Daphnella concinna is a species of sea snail, a marine gastropod mollusk in the family Raphitomidae.

Distribution
This marine species occurs off Samoa and the Andaman Islands.

References

External links
 Dunker, W. (1857). Mollusca nova collectionis Cumingianae. Proceedings of the Zoological Society of London. 24: 354-358
 

concinna
Gastropods described in 1857